Pyrgomorphidae is a family of grasshoppers in the order Orthoptera; it is the only family in the superfamily Pyrgomorphoidea, with a pan-tropical distribution.  Their name is probably derived from pyrgos (Greek: Πύργος) meaning "tower": a reference to the form (morph) of the head in the type genus Pyrgomorpha and other genera.

They may sometimes be known as "gaudy grasshoppers", due to the striking, often aposematic colouration of a number of genera; however many others are camouflaged or cryptic, including the genus Pyrgomorpha.

Subfamilies and tribes 
Incomplete list of genera and species:

Subfamily Orthacridinae
All tribes and selected genera only are shown here:
 Tribe Brunniellini Kevan, 1963 - Philippines
 Tribe Chapmanacridini Kevan & Akbar, 1964 - W. Africa
 Tribe Fijipyrgini Kevan, 1966 - Fiji
 Tribe Geloiini Bolívar, 1905 - Madagascar
 Tribe Gymnohippini Kevan & Akbar, 1964 - Madagascar
 Tribe Ichthiacridini Kevan, Singh & Akbar, 1964 - Mexico
 Tribe Ichthyotettigini Kevan, Singh & Akbar, 1964 - Mexico
 Tribe Malagasphenini Kevan & Akbar, 1964 - Madagascar
 Tribe Mitricephalini Kevan & Akbar, 1964 - Malesia
 Tribe Nereniini Kevan, 1964 - Vietnam, PNG
 Genus Nerenia: Nerenia francoisi Bolívar, 1905 (monotypic)
 Genus Megradina: Megradina festiva Storozhenko, 2004 (monotypic)
 Tribe Orthacridini Bolívar, 1905 - E. Africa, Madagascar, India, Indo-China

 Genus Kuantania Miller, 1935
 Genus Neorthacris Kevan & Singh, 1964
 Genus Orthacris Bolívar, 1884
 Tribe Popoviini Kevan & Akbar, 1964 - E. Africa to India
 Genus Popovia Uvarov, 1952
 Tribe Psednurini Burr, 1904 - Australia
 Tribe Sagittacridini Descamps & Wintrebert, 1966 - Madagascar
 Tribe Verduliini Kevan & Akbar, 1964 - Philippines to PNG

Subfamily Pyrgomorphinae
Some notable genera and species are shown here:
 Tribe Atractomorphini - Africa, Asia, Australia

 Genus Atractomorpha
 Tribe Chlorizeinini Kevan & Akbar, 1964 - Africa, Asia
 Genus Chlorizeina Brunner von Wattenwyl, 1893
 Tribe Chrotogonini Bolívar, 1904 - Africa, Asia
 Tribe Desmopterini - W. Africa, Asia, Australia
 Genus Desmoptera: including Desmoptera truncatipennis
 Tribe Dictyophorini - Africa

 Genus Dictyophorus: including Dictyophorus spumans
 Tribe Monistriini - Australia
 Genus Monistria: including Monistria cicatricosa and Monistria pustulifera
 Tribe Omurini Kevan, 1961 - South America
 Tribe Petasidini - Australia
 Genus Petasida: including Petasida ephippigera (Leichhardt's grasshopper)
 Tribe Phymateini - Africa (incl. Madagascar), China

 Genus Phymateus
 Genus Zonocerus
 Tribe Poekilocerini Burmeister, 1840 - Africa, India, Indo-China, Malesia, PNG
 Genus Poekilocerus Serville, 1831
 Tribe Psednurini - Australia
 Genus Psednura
 Tribe Pseudomorphacridini Kevan & Akbar, 1964 - Indo-China
 Genus Pseudomorphacris Carl, 1916
 Tribe Pyrgomorphini - Africa, W. Asia through to India
 Genus Pyrgomorpha Serville, 1838
 Genus Pyrgomorphella Bolívar, 1904
 Tribe Schulthessiini Kevan & Akbar, 1964 - Madagascar
 Tribe Sphenariini Bolívar, 1884 - Central America, Africa, China
 Genus Sphenarium Charpentier, 1845
 Tribe Tagastini Bolívar, 1905 - SE Asia
 Genus Tagasta Bolívar, 1905
 Tribe Taphronotini Bolívar, 1904 - Africa, India, Indo-China
 Genus Aularches Stål, 1873: monotypic Aularches miliaris

References

External links

Pyrgomorphoidea at the Global Biodiversity Information Facility Portal

 
Orthoptera families
Taxa named by Carl Brunner von Wattenwyl